Jeffrey Boomhouwer (born 15 June 1988) is a Dutch handball player for HV Aalsmeer and the Dutch national team.

He represented the Netherlands at the 2020 European Men's Handball Championship.

References

External links

1988 births
Living people
Dutch male handball players
Sportspeople from Amsterdam
Expatriate handball players
Dutch expatriate sportspeople in Germany
MT Melsungen players
Handball-Bundesliga players
Bergischer HC players